Bear Facts is a 1938 Our Gang short comedy film directed by Gordon Douglas. It was the 163rd Our Gang short (164th episode, 74th talking short, and 75th talking episode) that was released.

Plot
In an effort to impress Darla (Darla Hood), Alfalfa (Carl Switzer) tells her that he is a famous bear trainer. Although he knows that Darla's father owns a circus, he does not know he owns a bear costume.

Cast

The Gang
 Darla Hood as Darla King
 Eugene Lee as Porky
 George McFarland as Spanky
 Carl Switzer as Alfalfa
 Billie Thomas as Buckwheat
 George the Monkey as Elmer

Additional cast
 Jack Pepper as Darla's father
 Ed Brandenberg as Fifi
 Jack Baxley as Expressman
 Al Pilario as Expressman
 Wilbur Pike as Bear
 Cooper Smith as Bear

See also
Our Gang filmography

References

External links

1938 films
1938 comedy films
1938 short films
American black-and-white films
Films directed by Gordon Douglas
Hal Roach Studios short films
Our Gang films
1930s American films